= Putri Pascualy =

Author and credit strategist

- Education: University of California, Berkeley
- Occupations: Author, Credit Strategist, Economist
- Employer: PAAMCO
- Notable work: Investing in Credit Hedge Funds

Putri Pascualy is an American author and credit strategist. She is the author of Investing in Credit Hedge Funds, a book focused on the topic of alternative investing in public and private corporate credit markets.

Pascualy's professional background includes roles as Senior Managing Director with Man Private Credit and Managing Director for Multi Strategy Credit for TPG Angelo Gordon, where she leveraged her investment background to engage with institutional, wealth and insurance LPs. Prior to that, she was a partner and managing director for PAAMCO, an institutional investment firm focused on alternative investments including private credit, hedge funds, leveraged finance (high yield and leveraged loans), structured products, secondaries, as well as direct investing - PAAMCO was acquired by KKR in 2017. Prior to joining PAAMCO in 2006, Pascualy was an economist with Cornerstone Research. She speaks at industry panels and conferences, and her comments and contributions have appeared in The Wall Street Journal, Bloomberg News, and U.S. News & World Report. Her recent comments include topics such as recent trends in private credit as well as the impact of scale on credit risk.

Pascualy received undergraduate and MBA degrees from the Haas School of Business at the University of California, Berkeley.
